TWWA is an initialism which can refer to:
 Tagolwanen Women Weavers Association, founded 2012, Banig
 Third World Women's Alliance, Black women's organization active in the United States from 1968 to 1980
 Trans-World Wrestling Association or Alliance, Japanese wrestling promotion which later became International Wrestling Enterprise